The 2007 Special Honours in New Zealand were two Special Honours Lists: the first was published on 6 February 2007, in which four appointments of additional members were made to the Order of New Zealand to celebrate the 20th anniversary of the establishment of the Order; and the second was dated 21 May 2007, and recognised the incumbent governor-general, Anand Satyanand. The appointments were made by Elizabeth II in her right as Queen of New Zealand, on the advice of the New Zealand government.

The recipients of honours are displayed here as they were styled before their new honour.

Order of New Zealand (ONZ)

Additional member
 Sir Brian James Lochore  – of Masterton.
 The Right Reverend and the Honourable Sir Paul Alfred Reeves  – of Auckland.
 Professor Christian Karlson Stead  – of Auckland.
 The Right Honourable Sir Arthur Owen Woodhouse  – of Auckland.

Companion of the Queen's Service Order (QSO)
Additional
 The Honourable Anand Satyanand  – Principal Companion of the Queen's Service Order and Governor-General and Commander-in-Chief in and over the Realm of New Zealand.

References

Special Honours
New Zealand Special Honours